The Aalt Stadhaus is a concert hall located in Differdange, Luxembourg.  Opened on 31 January 2014, it has a maximum capacity of 201 people. 

The building was nominated for a Mies van der Rohe Award for architecture in 2014.

References

External links
 Aalt Stadhaus Website

Differdange
Concert halls in Luxembourg
Architecture in Luxembourg